The Reflex Lightning Bug, also called the Jones Lightning Bug, is an American homebuilt aircraft that was designed by Nick Jones and produced by Reflex Fiberglass Works of Walterboro, South Carolina, introduced in the mid-1990s. When it was available the aircraft was supplied as a kit for amateur construction.

Design and development
The Lightning Bug features a cantilever low-wing, a single-seat enclosed cockpit under a bubble canopy, fixed tricycle landing gear with wheel pants, a retractable nose wheel and a single engine in tractor configuration.

The aircraft is made from a combination of stainless steel and fiberglass. The standard engine used is the  AMW 808 in-line three cylinder, liquid-cooled, two-stroke, dual ignition, aircraft engine.

The manufacturer estimated the construction time from the supplied kit as 300 hours.

Operational history
In February 2014 two examples were registered in the United States with the Federal Aviation Administration, although a total of nine had been registered at one time.

Specifications (Lightning Bug)

See also
List of aerobatic aircraft

References

External links
Photo of a Lightning Bug

Lightning Bug
1990s United States sport aircraft
1990s United States civil utility aircraft
Single-engined tractor aircraft
Low-wing aircraft
Homebuilt aircraft
Aerobatic aircraft